Virology Journal is an open-access peer-reviewed medical journal published by BioMed Central. It publishes research related to viruses and the prevention of viral infection (including vaccination, the use of antiviral agents, and gene therapy). The journal was established in 2004 with Robert Garry (Tulane University) as founding editor-in-chief and has been edited by Linfa Wang since 2012. It aims to cover rapid communications amongst virologists.

Controversy 
On 21 July 2010, Virology Journal published an article entitled "Influenza or not influenza: Analysis of a case of high fever that happened 2000 years ago in Biblical time". Jesus then took her by the hand and the fever immediately left. The authors rule out that the woman was possessed by demons, and conclude that she was struck with influenza as "the fever retreated instantaneously. This implies that the disease was probably not a severe acute bacterial infection (such as sepsis) or subacute endocarditis that would not resolved instantaneously" .

This article created controversy amongst scientists, who decried the article from anywhere from "truly bizarre" to "garbage", as well as expressing puzzlement over how the article got published in the first place. The editor-in-chief of Virology Journal originally commented that the submission underwent standard peer review, and was recommended for acceptance after modification by both reviewers, but later apologized for the publication of the article and announced that it would be retracted. The article was retracted on 13 August 2010.

Ellis Hon, the paper's lead author, told RetractionWatch that he agreed to the retraction after the amount of negative publicity generated by the paper.

Abstracting and indexing 
Virology Journal is abstracted and indexed in

References

Further reading

External links 
 

BioMed Central academic journals
Open access journals
Publications established in 2004
English-language journals
Virology
Creative Commons Attribution-licensed journals
Virology journals